Peeter Mardna (born on 24 October 1938 Tallinn) is an Estonian rower, coach, sport personnel and physician.

In 1966 he graduated from Tartu State University's department of medicine.

In 1969 he won Moscow Regatta (two-boat discipline). From 1960 to 1971 he became the 9-time Estonian champion in different rowing disciplines.

He was a rowing coach at the Moscow and Seoul Olympic Games and at the 1995 World Rowing Championships.

From 1992 to 2001 he was a member of Estonian Olympic Committee. From 1991 to 2001 he was the president of the Estonian Rowing Federation.

Awards:
 2002: Order of the Estonian Red Cross, IV class.

References

Living people
1938 births
Estonian male rowers
Estonian people in sports
Estonian sports coaches
Estonian physicians
University of Tartu alumni
People from Tallinn
Sportspeople from Tallinn